Riwaayat earlier Riwaayat-e-Maihar is a classical music event which sticks to the classical form of rendition. The group belongs to Maihar gharana. The event features fine artistes who still practice the traditional way of rendering music.

History
Riwaayat meaning Tradition in Urdu, started in 2010 in Hyderabad at Hyderabad Central University, S.N.School of Performing Arts & Communication.

2012 events
 Manjusha Kulkarni-Patil (Hindustani vocal) - 24 February 2012

2011 event
The event was held on 9 and 10 December 2011 at Vidyaranya High School, Hyderabad

 Jayateerth Mevundi (vocal) - Kirana gharana
 Sanhita Nandi (vocal) - Kirana gharana

2010 event
 Suresh Vyas (Sarod)
 Basant Kabra (Sarod)
 Dr. Angara.V.Raja (Sitar)
 Pt. Nityanad Haldipur

See also

References

External links
 Official site

Music festivals established in 2010
Hindustani classical music festivals
Festivals in Hyderabad, India
Maihar gharana